A Pythagorean cup (also known as a Pythagoras cup, Greedy Cup, Cup of Justice or Tantalus cup) is a practical joke device in a form of a drinking cup, credited to Pythagoras of Samos. When it is filled beyond a certain point, a siphoning effect causes the cup to drain its entire contents through the base. The cup can be used to learn about greed.

Origin 
Pythagorean siphons were originally introduced by Pythagoras in 6th century B.C.

Form and function

A Pythagorean cup looks like a normal drinking cup, except that the bowl has a central column in it, giving it a shape like a Bundt pan. The central column of the bowl is positioned directly over the stem of the cup and over a hole at the bottom of the stem. A small open pipe runs from this hole almost to the top of the central column, where there is an open chamber. The chamber is connected by a second pipe to the bottom of the central column, where a hole in the column exposes the pipe to (the contents of) the bowl of the cup. 

When the cup is filled, liquid rises through the second pipe up to the chamber at the top of the central column, following Pascal's principle of communicating vessels. As long as the level of the liquid does not rise beyond the level of the chamber, the cup functions as normal. If the level rises further, however, the liquid spills through the chamber into the first pipe and out of the bottom. Gravity then creates a siphon through the central column, causing the entire contents of the cup to be emptied through the hole at the bottom of the stem.

Mechanics 
A Pythagorean siphon is composed of 4 chambers with 1 chamber in the center that liquids can escape through. As liquid fills up the 4 chambers, the pressure acting on the liquids remains constant and so the level of liquid in each chamber remains the same. Once the liquid reaches the top of the Pythagorean siphon it begins to escape through the central chamber as the effects of gravity take hold. As this process happens, the liquid from both two chambers next to each side of the central chamber forms a seal above the central chamber due to the surface tension of the liquids. Due to this seal, air can then not escape through the central chamber, so the weight of the water in the central chamber forces all the remaining liquid in every chamber to pour out of the Pythagorean siphon.

Applications

Toilets 
Most modern flush toilets operate on the same principle: when the water level in the bowl rises high enough, a siphon is created, emptying the bowl.

Washing machines 
The fabric softener tray in a top-load washing machine operates by utilizing a Pythagorean siphon to distribute fabric softener diluted with water across the clothing in the washing machine. Before starting the washing machine, the user pours fabric softener below the maximum fabric softener line in the loading tray. This line designates the point where if the softener were to be poured above it, then all the fabric softener would resultingly escape the device due to the mechanics of the Pythagorean siphon. As one pours the fabric softener under the line, it does not escape anywhere because it has not begun to escape through the center chamber. Once the washing machine works to distribute the fabric softener into the tub of the machine, it pours water above the fabric softener loading tray so that the liquid goes overtop the maximum fill line. This starts the Pythagorean siphon process, as the mixture begins to pour through the central chamber, thus causing a seal from the surface tension of the liquids across all the chambers. The weight of the fabric softener diluted with water has no access to the outside air because of the seal which then causes all the mixture to be poured directly into the washing machine.

See also
 Dribble glass
 Fuddling cup
 Heron's fountain
 List of practical joke topics
 Puzzle jug
 Soxhlet extractor, which uses the same mechanism.
 Qiqi, a Chinese cup with a similar function.

References

External links 

 James Stanley — Towards a Better Pythagorean Cup
 A 2014 design for 3D printing your own Pythagoras Cup
 The history of Pythagorean Cup
 The Fascinating Story of the Pythagorean Cup: A Cup of Justice and Mystery

Ancient inventions
Drinkware
Fluid dynamics
Practical joke devices
Samos
Wine accessories